I Thought You Were Sleeping EP is the follow-up to Matt Pond PA's second album Measure. It was released on April 17, 2001.

Track listing
 "Other Countries" – 3:24
 "Put Your Hair Down" – 3:38
 "St. Andrews" – 1:55
 "I Thought You Were Sleeping" – 2:30
 "Measure 5" – 3:46

Personnel
Jim Hosetter – cello
Rosie McNamara-Jones – violin
Brendan Kilroy – bass
Mike Kennedy – drums, vibraphone
Matt Pond – guitar, vocals, trumpet
Rachael Dietkus – violin, vocals
Steve Gunn – guitar
Matt Werth – talk
Mary Garito – vocals, talk
Adela Smith – talk
Julia Rivers – French horn
Brian McTear – keyboards, guitar, bass, talk, vocals, credits

Technical personnel
Engineered by Brian McTear at MinerStreet/CycleSound
Produced by Brian McTear and Matt Pond
Mastered by John Baker at Maja Audio Group

Matt Pond PA EPs
2001 EPs